The Kingdom of Kampuchea was a puppet state of the Empire of Japan that existed from 9 March 1945 to 16 October 1945.

History 
On 9 March 1945, during the closing stages of World War II, Japan overthrew the French rule in Indochina. The French colonial administrators were relieved of their positions, and French military forces were ordered to disarm. The Japanese hoped to revive the flagging support of local populations for Tokyo's war effort by encouraging indigenous rulers to proclaim independence. On 13 March, the young King Norodom Sihanouk proclaimed an independent Kingdom of Kampuchea (while changing the official name of the country in French from Cambodge to Kampuchea) following a formal request by the Japanese. Shortly thereafter the Japanese government nominally ratified the independence of Cambodia and established a consulate in Phnom Penh. Sihanouk's decree did away with previous French-Cambodian treaties and he pledged his newly independent country's cooperation and alliance with Japan. The new government did away with the romanisation of the Khmer language that the French colonial administration was beginning to enforce and officially reinstated the Khmer script. This measure taken by the short-lived governmental authority would be popular and long-lasting, for since then no government in Cambodia has tried to romanise the Khmer language again. Other changes included the reinstating of the Buddhist lunar calendar.

Norodom Sihanouk initially also served as a prime minister from 18 March 1945. However, Son Ngoc Thanh, another of the men behind the Khmer-language newspaper Nagara Vatta who had fled to Japan following the 1942 anti-French demonstrations, had returned in April 1945 to serve as foreign minister. Son Ngoc Thanh would take over the position of prime minister following the surrender of Japan, serving until French restoration in October 1945.

The Japanese occupation of Cambodia ended with the official surrender of Japan in August 1945. After Allied military units entered Cambodia, the Japanese military forces present in the country were disarmed and repatriated. The French were able to reimpose the colonial administration in Phnom Penh in October the same year. After arresting Son Ngoc Thanh for collaboration with the Japanese on 12 October, the French colonial authorities exiled him to France, where he lived under house arrest. Some of his supporters went underground and escaped to Thai-controlled northwestern Cambodia, where they were eventually to join forces in a pro-independence group, the Khmer Issarak. This anti-French, politically heterogeneous nationalist movement was organised with Thai backing, but would later split into factions.

Leaders

See also 

 Japanese occupation of Cambodia
 French protectorate of Cambodia
 Kingdom of Luang Phrabang (1945)

References 

Former countries in Cambodian history
1945 in Cambodia
1940s in French Indochina
1945 establishments in Cambodia
1945 disestablishments in Cambodia
Axis powers
Former kingdoms
States and territories established in 1945
States and territories disestablished in 1945